Norfolk Fire and Rescue Service (NFRS) is the statutory fire and rescue service for the county of Norfolk in the east of England. The county consists of around 870,100 people, covering the 4th largest area in England with 2,074 square miles including 200 miles of inland waterways, 90 miles of coastline and 6,125 miles of roads. The county city is Norwich with other major towns including Great Yarmouth, King's Lynn and Thetford. Norfolk has one of the 20 Urban Search and Rescue teams across England and Wales which were set up in response to the 9/11 attacks. The teams, including Norfolk, have the capacity to deal with two simultaneous incidents across the UK.

Headquarters and Control Room

The headquarters of Norfolk Fire and Rescue Service is Jubilee House, Falconers Chase, Wymondham, Norfolk in a combined HQ with Norfolk Constabulary. The joint operations centre is located within the Contact and Control Room (CCR) of Norfolk Constabulary. The former headquarters, Whitegates, was commandeered for use by the National Fire Service during the Second World War and was eventually purchased by Norfolk County Council in 1950. The building was built as a family home in the late eighteenth century and has had various owners over the years. New building at the rear of the original house in recent times has replaced the coach house and stables of earlier times.

Performance
In 2021/2022, every fire and rescue service in England and Wales was subjected to a statutory inspection by Her Majesty's Inspectorate of Constabulary and Fire & Rescue Services (HIMCFRS). The inspection investigated how well the service performs in each of three areas. On a scale of outstanding, good, requires improvement and inadequate, Norfolk Fire and Rescue Service was rated as follows:

Appliances and Capabilities 

NFRS operates a range of firefighting appliances, which includes:
37 pumping appliances: the standard firefighting vehicle mobilised to all emergency calls. These appliances are equipped with a high-pressure two-stage main pump also capable of making foam via an onboard foam inductor system, two high-pressure hose reels, a set of rescue ladders, a light portable fire pump, four / six breathing apparatus sets (depending on age), two spare breathing air cylinders and hydraulic rescue equipment, as well as other miscellaneous tools.
10 rural pumping appliances: similar to the rescue pump but with less rescue equipment and designed for rural areas
4 heavy rescue pumps: very similar to the pumping appliance, however more emphasis on rescue operations and incidents.
3 aerial ladder platforms: extendible ladder platforms with rescue cages, stretchers and additional lighting, these vehicles provide high-level access and firefighting capability, with a vertical reach of almost 100 ft, almost 80 ft sideways, and up to 55 ft below ground level.
5 tactical response vehicles (TRV): they are designed to operate in extreme weather conditions and at difficult to reach locations. They carry a range of specialist equipment to tackle a wide range of incidents. This includes a misting unit and water tank for tackling wildfires and the ability to switch kit for other scenarios, including cutting gear for use at road traffic collisions.
Urban Search & Rescue: Norfolk Fire and Rescue Service has one of 20 urban search and rescue teams that exist across England and Wales. They can deal with incidents including Confined space rescues, Missing person searches, Rescues from height, Local and national flood response, Water rescues, Bariatric rescue, Animal Rescue and MTA Response. They have a range of specialist vehicles operated by firefighter technicians. They also have a search dog and handler.

Fire stations 

The service has 42 fire stations. The stations are divided into four areas, Central, Eastern, Western and Southern. These stations include:

 6 wholetime shift stations
 39 on-call stations
 2 wholetime day-crewed stations

The stations are crewed by mixture of wholetime (works full time at a fire station to respond immediately), day-crewed (works full time at a fire station only during the day) and on-call/retained (where they live locally and travel to their fire station when their alerter/pager goes off). Some stations are also cross-crewed by a mixture of firefighters from other stations, wholetime and on-call.

Incidents 
In 2014–15, NFRS attended 7,285 incidents where 749 people were rescued and 63 fatalities. Mainly consisting of 2,143 fires, 2,809 special services  road traffic collisions (RTC) and other  and 2,333 false alarms which required no further action. The service have noticed a reduction in the number of fires they attend, however an increasing response to RTC incidents on Norfolk's roads.

Notable incidents

1991 Thetford  Plastic recycling centre.  A large fire which burned for four days
1994 Norwich  Norwich library destroyed by fire. The main fire station of Norwich was opposite the library but the crews were already out attending what turned out to be a malicious call. Due to the dramatic spread of the fire the building could not be saved
1995 Wroxham  a ten-hour blaze in a department store
2011 Great Yarmouth  four men killed in industrial accident; nine fire crews attended
2013 Norwich  eleven people injured in low speed train crash at Norwich railway station. The signal box was not alerted to the accident for 24 minutes
2014 Fakenham  90 firefighters attended a fire in a department store
2016 Great Yarmouth  20 plus appliances and 88 fire crews attend large fire on Regent road inside Regent Arcade and Super Bowl UK Regent. Building destroyed.

See also
2002-2003 UK firefighter dispute
History of fire brigades in the United Kingdom
History of fire safety legislation in the United Kingdom
List of British firefighters killed in the line of duty

References

External links

Norfolk Fire and Rescue Service at HMICFRS

Fire and rescue services of England